Paner is a village in Ajmer district in Rajasthan, India

Paner may also refer to:
 Danita Paner (born 1989), Filipino pop-rock singer and actress
 Kristina Paner (born 1971), Filipina actress and singer
 Manuel Paner (born 1949), better known as Manny Paner, Filipino basketball player